Hamid Rasaee (born 23 July 1967) is an Iranian Shia cleric and principlist politician and former member of the Islamic Consultative Assembly. He publishes the Noh Dey Weekly (means: Ninth Dey Weekly).

Parliamentary career

Electoral history

References

External links

Living people
1967 births
Members of the 9th Islamic Consultative Assembly
Members of the 8th Islamic Consultative Assembly
Coalition of the Pleasant Scent of Servitude politicians
Front of Islamic Revolution Stability politicians
Iranian newspaper publishers (people)